Gods of Aberdeen is a novel written by Micah Nathan, published in June 2005 by Simon & Schuster. It was translated into Italian, Russian, Spanish, and Portuguese with the title The Last Alchemist. The novel is written in first-person, and follows the freshman year of the narrator, Eric Dunne, a 16-year-old linguistic savant who attends fictional Aberdeen College, in the town of Fairwich, Connecticut. The novel achieved best-seller status in Italy, selling over 40k copies.

References

2005 American novels
Novels by Micah Nathan
Novels set in Connecticut
Simon & Schuster books
2005 debut novels